The name Peisander or Pisander (Peisandros) can refer to several historical figures:

 Peisander of Camirus in Rhodes, Ancient Greek epic poet, supposed to have flourished about 640 BC
 Peisander (general), Spartan general during the Corinthian War
 Peisander (oligarch), Athenian who played a prominent part in the Athenian coup of 411 BCE
 Peisander of Laranda, epic poet who flourished during the reign of Alexander Severus
 Peisander (mythology), several characters in Greek mythology